Waldir Alves Figueiras (11 November 1937 – 17 July 1977) was a Brazilian footballer who competed in the 1960 Summer Olympics.

References

1937 births
1977 deaths
Association football forwards
Brazilian footballers
Olympic footballers of Brazil
Footballers at the 1960 Summer Olympics
Nacional Atlético Clube (SP) players